Shane Campbell is an MMA fighter.

Shane Campbell may also refer to:

Shane Campbell (soccer)
Shane Campbell (ice hockey), in 2001 ECAC Hockey Men's Ice Hockey Tournament